is the tenth studio album released by Mr. Children on April 7, 2004, which became the 2nd best selling album in 2004 .Its limited edition includes a documentary DVD on the making of the album and an interview with the band. The song "Tagatame" was originally made as a country-style song, but the band re-arranged the song as a rock song because Kazutoshi Sakurai felt that the lyric of the song didn't match the original arrangement.

Track listing
 
 "Paddle"
 
 
 
 
 
 
 "Any"
 
 
 "Hero"

References

2004 albums
Mr. Children albums
Albums produced by Takeshi Kobayashi
Japanese-language albums